The 2004 Solomon Islands National Club Championship was the 2nd season of the National Club Championship in the Solomon Islands. Central Realas FC won the league for the first time . All matches were played at the hillside ground called Lawson Tama Stadium, with an approximate capacity of 20,000.

Teams 
 AH BYC
 Buala FC
 Central Realas FC
 Choiseul Bay
 Goosa
 Kuara FC
 Kutuma
 Makuru FC
 Tulagi Tatala

References 

Solomon Islands S-League seasons
2004 in Solomon Islands sport